Susan Dumais (born August 11, 1953) is an American computer scientist who is a leader in the field of information retrieval, and has been a significant contributor to Microsoft's search technologies.
According to Mary Jane Irwin, who heads the Athena Lecture awards committee, “Her sustained contributions have shaped the thinking and direction of human-computer interaction and information retrieval."

Biography
Susan Dumais is a Technical Fellow at Microsoft and Managing Director of the Microsoft Research Northeast Labs, inclusive of MSR New England, MSR New York and MSR Montreal.  She is also an Affiliate Professor at the University of Washington Information School.

Before joining Microsoft in 1997, Dumais was a researcher at Bellcore (now Telcordia Technologies), where she and her colleagues conducted research into what is now called the vocabulary problem in information retrieval. Their study demonstrated, through a variety of experiments, that different people use different vocabulary to describe the same thing, and that even choosing the "best" term to describe something is not enough for others to find it.  One implication of this work is that because the author of a document may use different vocabulary than someone searching for the document, traditional information retrieval methods will have limited success.

Dumais and the other Bellcore researchers then began investigating ways to build search systems that avoided the vocabulary problem. The result was their invention of Latent Semantic Indexing.

Awards
In 2006, Dumais was inducted as a Fellow of the Association for Computing Machinery. In 2009, she received the Gerard Salton Award, an information retrieval lifetime achievement award. In 2011, she was inducted to the National Academy of Engineering for innovation and leadership in organizing, accessing, and interacting with information. In 2014, Dumais received the Athena Lecturer Award for "fundamental contributions to computer science.". and the Tony Kent Strix award for "sustained contributions that are both innovative and practical" with "significant impact".
In 2015, she was inducted into the American Academy of Arts and Sciences. In 2020 she received the SIGCHI Lifetime Research Award.

References

External links
 Home page at Microsoft Research

Fellows of the Association for Computing Machinery
Microsoft employees
Microsoft Research people
Living people
American women computer scientists
American computer scientists
University of Washington faculty
Information retrieval researchers
Microsoft technical fellows
American women academics
1953 births
21st-century American women